Sarin Darreh (also Romanized as Sarīn Darreh) is a village in Mah Neshan Rural District, in the Central District of Mahneshan County, Zanjan Province, Iran. At the 2006 census, its population was 173, in 42 families.

References 

Populated places in Mahneshan County